The women's 60 metres event at the 2023 European Athletics Indoor Championships was held on 3 March 2023 at 12:05 (heats), at 19:05 (semi-finals)  and at 21:45 (final) local time.

Medalists

Records

Results

Heats
Qualification: First 4 in each heat (Q) and the next 4 fastest (q) advance to the Semifinals.

Semifinals
Qualification: First 2 in each heat (Q) and the next 2 fastest (q) advance to the Final.

Final

References

2023 European Athletics Indoor Championships
60 metres at the European Athletics Indoor Championships
2023 in women's athletics